Discourse is a generalization of the notion of a conversation to any form of communication. Discourse is a major topic in social theory, with work spanning fields such as sociology, anthropology, continental philosophy, and discourse analysis. Following pioneering work by Michel Foucault, these fields view discourse as a system of thought, knowledge, or communication that constructs our experience of the world. Since control of discourse amounts to control of how the world is perceived, social theory often studies discourse as a window into power. Within theoretical linguistics, discourse is understood more narrowly as linguistic information exchange and was one of the major motivations for the framework of dynamic semantics, in which expressions' denotations are equated with their ability to update a discourse context.

Social theory
In the humanities and social sciences, discourse describes a formal way of thinking that can be expressed through language. Discourse is a social boundary that defines what statements can be said about a topic. Many definitions of discourse are largely derived from the work of French philosopher Michel Foucault. In sociology, discourse is defined as "any practice (found in a wide range of forms) by which individuals imbue reality with meaning".

Political science sees discourse as closely linked to politics and policy making. Likewise, different theories among various disciplines understand discourse as linked to power and state, insofar as the control of discourses is understood as a hold on reality itself (e.g. if a state controls the media, they control the "truth"). In essence, discourse is inescapable, since any use of language will have an effect on individual perspectives. In other words, the chosen discourse provides the vocabulary, expressions, or style needed to communicate. For example, two notably distinct discourses can be used about various guerrilla movements, describing them either as "freedom fighters" or "terrorists".

In psychology, discourses are embedded in different rhetorical genres and meta-genres that constrain and enable them—language talking about language. This is exemplified in the APA's Diagnostic and Statistical Manual of Mental Disorders, which tells of the terms that have to be used in speaking about mental health, thereby mediating meanings and dictating practices of professionals in psychology and psychiatry.

Modernism
Modernist theorists were focused on achieving progress and believed in the existence of natural and social laws which could be used universally to develop knowledge and thus a better understanding of society. Such theorists would be preoccupied with obtaining the "truth" and "reality", seeking to develop theories which contained certainty and predictability. Modernist theorists therefore understood discourse to be functional. Discourse and language transformations are ascribed to progress or the need to develop new or more "accurate" words to describe new discoveries, understandings, or areas of interest. In modernist theory, language and discourse are dissociated from power and ideology and instead conceptualized as "natural" products of common sense usage or progress. Modernism further gave rise to the liberal discourses of rights, equality, freedom, and justice; however, this rhetoric masked substantive inequality and failed to account for differences, according to Regnier.

Structuralism (Saussure & Lacan)
Structuralist theorists, such as Ferdinand de Saussure and Jacques Lacan, argue that all human actions and social formations are related to language and can be understood as systems of related elements. This means that the "individual elements of a system only have significance when considered in relation to the structure as a whole, and that structures are to be understood as self-contained, self-regulated, and self-transforming entities". In other words, it is the structure itself that determines the significance, meaning and function of the individual elements of a system. Structuralism has made an important contribution to our understanding of language and social systems. Saussure's theory of language highlights the decisive role of meaning and signification in structuring human life more generally.

Poststructuralism (Foucault)
Following the perceived limitations of the modern era, emerged postmodern theory. Postmodern theorists rejected modernist claims that there was one theoretical approach that explained all aspects of society. Rather, postmodernist theorists were interested in examining the variety of experiences of individuals and groups and emphasized differences over similarities and common experiences.

In contrast to modernist theory, postmodern theory is more fluid, allowing for individual differences as it rejects the notion of social laws. Such theorists shifted away from truth-seeking, and instead sought answers for how truths are produced and sustained. Postmodernists contended that truth and knowledge are plural, contextual, and historically produced through discourses. Postmodern researchers therefore embarked on analyzing discourses such as texts, language, policies, and practices.

Foucault 

In the works of the philosopher Michel Foucault, a discourse is “an entity of sequences, of signs, in that they are enouncements (énoncés).” The enouncement (l’énoncé, “the statement”) is a linguistic construct that allows the writer and the speaker to assign meaning to words and to communicate repeatable semantic relations to, between, and among the statements, objects, or subjects of the discourse. There exist internal relations among the signs (semiotic sequences) that are between and among the statements, objects, or subjects of the discourse. The term discursive formation identifies and describes written and spoken statements with semantic relations that produce discourses. As a researcher, Foucault applied the discursive formation to analyses of large bodies of knowledge, e.g. political economy and natural history.

In The Archaeology of Knowledge (1969), a treatise about the methodology and historiography of systems of thought (“epistemes”) and of knowledge (“discursive formations”), Michel Foucault developed the concepts of discourse. The sociologist Iara Lessa summarizes Foucault's definition of discourse as "systems of thoughts composed of ideas, attitudes, courses of action, beliefs, and practices that systematically construct the subjects and the worlds of which they speak." Foucault traces the role of discourse in the legitimation of society's power to construct contemporary truths, to maintain said truths, and to determine what relations of power exist among the constructed truths; therefore discourse is a communications medium through which power relations produce men and women who can speak.

The inter-relation between power and knowledge renders every human relationship into a power negotiation, because power is always present and so produces and constrains the truth. Power is exercised through rules of exclusion (discourses) that determine what subjects people can discuss; when, where, and how a person may speak; and determines which persons are allowed speak. That knowledge is both the creator of power and the creation of power, Foucault coined the term power-knowledge to show that an object becomes a "node within a network" of meanings. In The Archaeology of Knowledge, Foucault's example is a book's function as a node within a network meanings. The book does not exist as an individual object, but exists as part of a structure of knowledge that is "a system of references to other books, other texts, other sentences." In the critique of power–knowledge, Foucault identified Neo-liberalism as a discourse of political economy which is conceptually related to governmentality, the organized practices (mentalities, rationalities, techniques) with which people are governed.

Interdiscourse studies the external semantic relations among discourses, because a discourse exists in relation to other discourses, e.g. books of history; thus do academic researchers debate and determine “What is a discourse?” and “What is not a discourse?” in accordance with the denotations and connotations (meanings) used in their academic disciplines.

Discourse analysis 
In discourse analysis, discourse is a conceptual generalization of conversation within each modality and context of communication. In this sense, the term is studied in corpus linguistics, the study of language expressed in corpora (samples) of "real world" text.

Moreover, because a discourse is a body of text meant to communicate specific data, information, and knowledge, there exist internal relations in the content of a given discourse, as well as external relations among discourses. As such, a discourse does not exist per se (in itself), but is related to other discourses, by way of inter-discursive practices.

In Francois Rastier's approach to semantics, discourse is understood as meaning the totality of codified language (i.e., vocabulary) used in a given field of intellectual enquiry and of social practice, such as legal discourse, medical discourse, religious discourse, etc. In this sense, along with that of Foucault's in the previous section, the analysis of a discourse examines and determines the connections among language and structure and agency.

Formal semantics and pragmatics 

In formal semantics and pragmatics, discourse is often viewed as the process of refining the information in a common ground. In some theories of semantics such as discourse representation theory, sentences' denotations themselves are equated with functions which update a common ground.

See also

References

Further reading
 

— (1980). "Two Lectures," in Power/Knowledge: Selected Interviews, edited by C. Gordon. New York; Pantheon Books.
 
 
 
 
 Howard, Harry. (2017). "Discourse 2." Brain and Language, Tulane University. [PowerPoint slides].

External links

 DiscourseNet, an international association for discourse studies.
 Beyond open access: open discourse, the next great equalizer, Retrovirology 2006, 3:55
 Discourse (Lun) in the Chinese tradition

Discourse analysis
Semantics
Sociolinguistics
Anthropology
Concepts in social philosophy
Debating